Bembidion festivum is a species of ground beetle in the family Carabidae. It is found in North America.

References 

festivum
Beetles described in 1918